Dover Lifeboat Station is a Royal National Lifeboat Institution (RNLI) lifeboat station located in the town of Dover in the English county of Kent.
The station first opened in 1837, coming under the RNLI’s control in 1855.

Among the awards won by Dover's crews over the years are 19 RNLI medals for bravery, 6 silver and 13 bronze, the last being awarded in 1998.

History 
The first rescue service at Dover was called the Dover Humane and Shipwreck Institution which was established in September 1837. Its former boathouse at the Dover Western Docks has been designated a Grade II listed building, along with the adjacent clock tower.

First closure 
From its inception until the First World War, the Dover station operated using rowing and sailing lifeboats. In September 1914, following the outbreak of war, the station was forced to close due to difficulties manning the lifeboat safely. The station re-opened in 1919, with a new steam lifeboat called James Stevens No. 3. Built in 1898 this single propeller lifeboat, one of only six steam driven lifeboats, was designed to be ready to steam immediately, at all times. However, the lifeboat still took at least 20 minutes to get up to steam and required a large technical crew to keep her fired up. It was launched only five times before the station was closed again in 1922.

Camber (East Docks) station 
With increased shipping and the advent of air traffic, the RNLI realised that a lifeboat station in Dover would again be required, and in 1929 a new boathouse was opened in the Eastern Docks at Camber. The re-opened station was supplied with a new faster lifeboat. The Sir William Hillary (ON 725), named after the founder of the RNLI, arrived on station in 1930 and was powered by twin 375 horsepower petrol engines with a top speed of 17.25 Knots. This was almost twice the speed of the rest of the RNLI’s fleet of lifeboats, most of which were capable of 9 Knots. The Dover station operated from this location until the Second World War. At the time of the Dunkirk evacuation the Sir William Hillary was away having a refit and overhaul. The relief lifeboat Agnes Cross remained at Dover until 1941, when the station closed again for the duration of the War.

Post-War re-opening 
In 1947 the Dover station began operations again, re-locating to the former Motor Torpedo Boat pens in the East Docks area. The rapid expansion of the Dover ferry terminal in the 1980s saw the lifeboat station move again, to the Tug Haven situated in the inner harbour across from the Cross Wall Quay.

1990s to present 

In the late 1990s, work began on a new station built on Cross Wall Quay. Construction was completed in 2000 and the station began operating in August 2001. The current lifeboat is a Severn-class lifeboat called City of London II (ON 1220) which has been on station since 1997 and is the seventeenth lifeboat to be stationed at Dover.

Fleet

References

External links 
 Dover Lifeboat Station

History of Kent
Lifeboat stations in Kent
Dover, Kent